David Joseph Costa (October 27, 1941 – May 20, 2013) was an American football defensive tackle.  He played high school football at Saunders Trades and Technical H.S in Yonkers and college football at the University of Utah and Northeastern Junior College in Sterling Colorado and in the American Football League with the Oakland Raiders from 1963 through 1965, the Buffalo Bills in 1966, and the Denver Broncos from 1967 through 1969. He was an AFL All-Star in 1963 for the Raiders (one of only two rookies in that game), and in 1967, 1968 and 1969 for the Broncos.  He also played in the American Football Conference of the National Football League for the Broncos, the San Diego Chargers, and the Bills.

See also
 List of American Football League players

References

1941 births
2013 deaths
American football defensive ends
American football defensive tackles
Buffalo Bills players
Denver Broncos (AFL) players
Denver Broncos players
Oakland Raiders players
San Diego Chargers players
Utah Utes football players
American Football League All-Star players
Sportspeople from Yonkers, New York
Players of American football from New York (state)
American Football League players